Miss Ukraine 2016, the 26th edition of the Miss Ukraine pageant was held at the October Palace in Kyiv on 2 September 2016. Twenty-five contestants from across Ukraine competed for the crown. The competition was hosted by Yuriy Horbunov and Kateryna Osadcha. Khrystyna Stoloka of Kyiv crowned her successor Oleksandra Kucherenko of Dnipro at the end of the event. Kucherenko represented Ukraine at the Miss World 2016 pageant where she unplaced.

Results

Placements

Special Awards

Contestants

Jury 
 Oleg Verniaiev – Ukrainian gymnast, Olympic champion at Rio 2016 Olimpics
 Vlada Litovchenko  – public figure, model, "Miss Ukraine 1995", PhD in History
 Vladimir Goryansky – People's Artist of Ukraine, film and theater actor
 Alina Baykova – top model, businesswoman
 Olga Vnukova – TV presenter, model, editor-in chief of "Most beautiful Ukrainian women"
 Julia Aysina – designer, founder of the brand AYSINA
 Dmitry Komarov – journalist, photographer, author and host of "World Inside Out" on 1+1 TV Channel
 Andre Tan – fashion designer, inventor of Smart Couture style
 Ana Varava – chief-editor of L'Officiel-Ukraine magazine
 Elizaveta Chepel – casting director of the National Committee of Miss Ukraine

References

External links

2016
2016 beauty pageants
2016 in Ukraine
September 2016 events in Ukraine